Wandesford may refer to:
Christopher Wandesford (1592–1640), English administrator and Member of Parliament
John Wandesford (1593–1665), English Member of Parliament
Michael Wandesford, an Anglican priest in the early seventeenth century.
Sir Rowland Wandesford (c. 1560-c. 1652), attorney of the Court of Wards and Liveries

See also
Christopher Wandesford (disambiguation)